Bradford Coleman (born February 26, 1988) is an American professional stock car racing driver. He mostly ran full or part-time in what is now the NASCAR Xfinity Series, with his last start coming in 2010. Prior to that, Coleman drove part-time in the ARCA Re/Max Series. He also made one Cup Series start in 2008. During his career, Coleman was a development driver for Brewco Motorsports and Joe Gibbs Racing.

Racing career
Coleman was discovered at an indoor karting center in Houston by LeMans champion Price Cobb. He set a record at the age of 16 years at the Rolex 24 at Daytona when he and his teammates finished 7th in the GT class driving a Porsche 911 GT3, making them the youngest team in history to drive and complete the famed race.

Following extensive training and racing in stock cars and formula cars, he made his big league stock car racing debut in the ARCA Re/Max Series at Nashville Superspeedway on April 15, 2006, where he finished second. In 9 starts, Coleman posted 8 top five finishes including 3 poles and 1 win. On June 10 of the same year, Coleman made his debut in the Busch Series the same week he graduated from high school. In 2007, Coleman ran 17 races for Joe Gibbs Racing in the No. 18 Chevrolet in the NASCAR Busch Series with Aric Almirola, Kevin Conway, and Tony Stewart filling in the remainder. He put together 3 top 5 finishes, 5 top 10 finishes, 7 top 15 finished and 9 top 20 finishes in only 14 races, including back to back top 5 finishes at Milwaukee and Kentucky and another top 5 finish at Watkins Glen.

It was announced in October 2007 that Coleman would leave Joe Gibbs Racing after the 2007 season. He signed with Baker Curb to drive the No. 27 Kleenex Ford Fusion full-time in the NASCAR Nationwide Series in 2008, and it was later announced that he had signed with Hall of Fame Racing as well, with plans of running a part-time schedule in 2008, and a full-time run in 2009.  He made his Sprint Cup Series debut in the No. 96 Toyota Camry starting at the 3M Performance 400 on August 17, 2008, due to previous driver J. J. Yeley being released.  Due to his new Sprint Cup ride, Coleman left Baker Curb Racing. However, after only one start, he was released by Hall of Fame Racing. In 2009 Coleman returned to the Nationwide Series for Joe Gibbs Racing.  He shared the No. 20 Toyota with Joey Logano and Denny Hamlin and drove 8 races. In 2010, he move back to Joe Gibbs Racing's No. 18 Toyota, the car he drove in 2007 and share the ride with Kyle Busch. During the year, Coleman ran six races with a best finish of 6th, twice.  He qualified on the outside front row at Kentucky, alongside teammate Joey Logano. He was running in the top-ten at Gateway until being involved in a wreck with teammate Matt DiBenedetto. At Road America he was leading inside of ten laps to go but was forced off the track on a late restart by Brad Keselowski but recovered to finish 6th.

Personal life
He was a high school graduate of Carlisle School.

Motorsports career results

NASCAR
(key) (Bold – Pole position awarded by qualifying time. Italics – Pole position earned by points standings or practice time. * – Most laps led.)

Sprint Cup Series

Nationwide Series

ARCA Re/Max Series
(key) (Bold – Pole position awarded by qualifying time. Italics – Pole position earned by points standings or practice time. * – Most laps led.)

References

External links

 
 
 CarinosRacing

1988 births
Living people
NASCAR drivers
Racing drivers from Houston
ARCA Menards Series drivers
Joe Gibbs Racing drivers